Sticks and Stones (stylized as Sticks + Stones for its European release and Sticks & Stones for its North American and Australian release) is the debut studio album by English recording artist Cher Lloyd. It was released on 4 November 2011, through Syco Records. Lloyd co-wrote five songs and worked with various producers and songwriters for her first full-length release, including The Runners, Kevin Rudolf, and Savan Kotecha, among others. Lloyd herself called the album a "jukebox."

The album was released on 2 October 2012 in the United States through Epic Records. Sticks + Stones debuted at number four in the United Kingdom, selling 55,668 copies in its first week, and at number nine in the United States, selling around 33,000 copies. The album received mixed reviews from music critics.

The album was preceded by the lead single, "Swagger Jagger", which was released on 29 July 2011. The song peaked at number two on the Irish Singles Chart and topped the Scottish and the UK Singles Chart. "With Ur Love" was confirmed as the second single from the album and was released on 30 October 2011, and became Lloyd's second consecutive top five single in both countries peaking at number four and five in the United Kingdom and Ireland. "Want U Back", featuring American rapper Astro, was released as the third single on 19 February 2012.

Background and development
After the final of the seventh series of The X Factor, it was announced that Lloyd had been signed by Syco Music. Songwriter Autumn Rowe and producer RedOne were soon rumoured to be working on Lloyd's debut album. On 28 July 2011, Lloyd previewed five tracks from the album during a UStream session, including tracks featuring Busta Rhymes, Mike Posner, Ghetts, Mic Righteous and Dot Rotten. Lloyd signed a record deal with Epic Records in the United States. To promote Sticks and Stones, Lloyd embarked on her first concert tour, the Sticks and Stones Tour, beginning in March 2012, visiting various venues across the United Kingdom.

Singles
"Swagger Jagger", the album's lead single, first leaked onto the internet on 15 June 2011. The single was released officially on 31 July 2011, reaching number one on the UK Singles Chart on 7 August 2011. As of December 2011, the single's sales have exceeded 220,000 copies.

"With Ur Love", the album's second single, features vocals from American singer Mike Posner. The single was released on 30 October 2011. The single peaked at number five in Ireland, number four in the United Kingdom and number three in Scotland. It has since sold over 200,000 copies. A solo version of the song was released as the third and final single from the album in the US version, and a different video was filmed.

"Want U Back" was released as the third official single from the album. It has sold over 120,000 copies in the UK. The British single version features vocals from American rapper Astro. The single was released on 19 February 2012. Parris directed the video. A solo version of the song served as Lloyd's debut single and the first from the album in the United States, released on Epic Records, run by her manager, L.A. Reid. The song sold around 2,000,000 copies, being certified double-platinum in America. 'Want U Back' is Lloyd's most successful single to date.

"Oath", produced by Dr. Luke and Cirkut, was released as the second US Single on 4 October 2012. The track features American singer and rapper Becky G. It sold around 500,000 copies in the US, being certified Gold. The track was released as a single in the United States, Canada, Australia and New Zealand only.

Promotional singles
On 21 October 2011, Cher Lloyd released the studio version for her cover of Shakespears Sister's "Stay" and the pre-order of "Sticks and Stones."

The song "Dub on the Track" featuring Mic Righteous, Dot Rotten & Ghetts had a music video released on 13 December 2011.

On September 1, 2012, Talkin' That was released as the first promotional single from the Sticks & Stones U.S. version.

Critical reception

Critical reception for the album has been mixed. At Metacritic, which assigns a normalised rating out of 100 to reviews from mainstream critics, the album received an average score of 51, based on 8 reviews, indicating "mixed or average reviews".

AllMusic gave the album three out of five stars, they said: "When Lloyd stops trying so hard, she's actually a pretty compelling pop star. "Want U Back" and "End Up Here" are both infectious examples of cutesy pure pop that recall Britney Spears" adding "At times, Sticks + Stones sounds like such a calculated effort to copy everything that's hot in 2011 that it's likely to feel utterly irrelevant by the time the clock strikes 12 on New Year's Eve."
BBC Music gave the album a positive review, they said: "Cher has a natural and charismatic vocal presence throughout" and ultimately called it "A sassy, splashy modern pop album that's much better than its dodgy lead single". 
Digital Spy awarded the album 4 out of 5 stars, they said: "Want U Back", "With Ur Love", "Playa Boi" and "Grow Up" are all tracks worthy of downloading, and went on to praise "Dub on the Track" as "loaded with attitude that few could pull off". 
Virgin Media gave the album 4 out of 5 stars, they said: "Sticks + Stones is a very pleasant shock. It's sparky and restless and sustains Lloyd's mini rapping firebrand/cute crooner aesthetic through a quickfire run of 10 top-notch songs."
NME gave the album 5 out of 10, they said: 'Grow Up', a grossly irritating slice of tweenish ragga-pop driven home with are-we-there-yet insistency, still-hideous 'Swagger Jagger' and bulldozing dubstep territory on 'Dub on the Track' but when Sticks + Stones stops charging about the place, there's evidence to suggest Cher is actually quite good at this pop malarkey. 'Want U Back' is a sassy bit of bubble-drunk pop, while 'End Up Here' finds Cher adopting a Beyoncé-aping vocal style with not-at-all-bad results.

Entertainment Weekly also gave the album a positive review, awarded it a B grade. They wrote "With her manic lowbrow sass – tiresome at length but lovable on singles like Want U Back – she makes these street-laced pop tracks her own in Sticks & Stones". Discussing Lloyd herself, they said she "has enough charisma for both sides of the Atlantic". They also declared "Swagger Jagger" and "Want U Back" the best tracks.
Glamour also praised the album. They said that "While Sticks & Stones isn't an album that will change the world, its radio-ready dance-pop and high-spirited energy is harmless and infectious enough to earn her an army of new fans in America", and laid heavy praise on "Oath" and "Behind the Music".

Commercial performance
The album debuted at number seven in Ireland. In the United Kingdom, the album entered the UK Albums Chart at number four behind new releases of Susan Boyle, Florence and the Machine and Michael Bublé. The album sold 55,668 copies in its opening week. As of September 2013, the album is certified gold by the BPI for shipments of 100,000 copies.

Track listing

Notes
"Playa Boi" interpolates portions of the composition entitled "Buffalo Stance" by Neneh Cherry.
"Swagger Jagger" interpolates melodic portions of the composition entitled "Oh My Darling Clementine"
 signifies a co-producer
 signifies a vocal producer

Charts

Weekly charts

Year-end charts

Certifications

Release history

References 

2011 debut albums
Albums produced by Cirkut
Albums produced by Dr. Luke
Albums produced by Max Martin
Albums produced by RedOne
Albums produced by the Runners
Albums produced by Shellback (record producer)
Albums produced by Toby Gad
Cher Lloyd albums
Epic Records albums
Albums produced by TMS (production team)